The 2010 Euro Beach Soccer League (EBSL) was an annual European competition in beach soccer. The competitions allows national teams to compete in beach soccer in a league format over the summer months. Each season ends with a superfinal, deciding the competition winner.

There were seven teams participating in two divisions in each Stage that faced each other in a round-robin system, with the exception of Stage 4. The top five teams of Division A (including the individual Stage winners) plus the host team Portugal played in the Superfinal in Vila Real de Santo António (Portugal) from August 26–29. The individual Stage winners in Division B plus the worst team in Division A played in the Promotional Final to try to earn promotion to Division A.

Teams

Stage 1 Moscow, Russia – May 28–30

Participating nations

Final standings Division A

Final standings Division B

Schedule & results

Individual awards 
MVP: Roberto Pasquali
Top Scorer: Roberto Pasquali and Bogusław Saganowski – 8 goals
Best Goalkeeper: Andrey Bukhlitskiy

Stage 2 Marseille, France – June 25–27

Participating nations

Final standings Division A

Final standings Division B

Schedule & results 

Top Scorer: Jorge

Stage 3 Lignano, Italy – July 2–4

Participating nations

Standings Division A

Standings Division B

Schedule & results

Individual awards 
MVP: Pasquale Carotenuto
Top Scorer: Dejan Stankovic – 7 goals
Best Goalkeeper: Paulo Graça

Stage 4 Den Haag (The Hague), Netherlands – July 22–25

Participating nations

Standings Division A

Schedule & results 

Top Scorer: Marian Măciucă

Division B (Bibione, Italy) – 16–17 July 

The games were played on 16 and 17 July 2010 in Bibione, Italy. Turkey won and qualified for the Promotional Final.

Andorra were originally supposed to compete in stage 4 as part of a regular three-team Division B event, but withdrew. In order to ensure the remaining participants (Turkey and Norway) still played two matches as organised, despite Andorra's absence, BSWW simply changed the fixture schedule to have Turkey and Norway play each other twice.

Since both teams were competing in Bibione as part of the 2011 World Cup qualifiers, BSWW staged the games there rather than unnecessarily having the squads travel to the Hague (as was originally planned) merely a week later.

Cumulative standings

Division A

Division B

EBSL Superfinal and Promotional Final - Lisbon, Portugal – August 26–29

Superfinal and Promotional Final Divisions 

The Divisions for the Euro Beach Soccer League Superfinal are determined. The teams from Division A will compete for the title while the teams from Division B will compete for a spot in next year's Division A round.

England will replace the Czech Republic due to several 'impediments' that caused them to withdraw.

Division A (Superfinal)

Group A standings

Group B standings

Schedule & results

Round-robin

Fifth-place match

Third-place match

Championship final match

Individual awards 
MVP: Madjer
Top Scorer: Dejan Stankovic – 8 goals
Best Goalkeeper: Andrey Bukhlitskiy

Final Division A standing

Division B (promotional final)

Group A standings

Group B standings

Schedule & results

Round-robin

Fifth-place match

Third-place match

Promotional final match

Final Division B standing

See also 
 Beach soccer
 Euro Beach Soccer League

References

External links 
 Beach Soccer Worldwide
 Eurosport TV
 Superfinal website

Euro Beach Soccer League
2010 in beach soccer